Mesopic vision, sometimes also called twilight vision, is a combination of photopic and scotopic vision under low-light (but not necessarily dark) conditions. Mesopic levels range approximately from 0.01 to 3.0 cd/m2 in luminance. Most nighttime outdoor and street lighting conditions are in the mesopic range.

Human eyes respond to certain light levels differently. This is because under high light levels typical during daytime (photopic vision), the eye uses cones to process light. Under very low light levels, corresponding to moonless nights without artificial lighting (scotopic vision), the eye uses rods to process light. At many nighttime levels, a combination of both cones and rods supports vision. Photopic vision facilitates excellent color perception, whereas colors are barely perceptible under scotopic vision. Mesopic vision falls between these two extremes. In most nighttime environments, enough ambient light prevents true scotopic vision.

In the words of Duco Schreuder:

The effect of switching from cones to rods in processing light is called the "Purkinje shift". In photopic vision, people are most sensitive to light that is greenish yellow. In scotopic vision, people are more sensitive to light that would appear greenish blue.

The traditional method of measuring light assumes photopic vision and is often a poor predictor of how a person sees at night. Typically research in this area has focused on improving street and outdoor lighting as well as aviation lighting.

Prior to 1951, there was no standard for scotopic photometry (light measurement); all measurements were based on the photopic spectral sensitivity function V(λ) which was defined in 1924. In 1951, the International Commission on Illumination (CIE) established the scotopic luminous efficiency function, V'(λ).  However, there was still no system of mesopic photometry. This lack of a proper measurement system can lead to difficulties in relating light measurements under mesopic luminances  to visibility.  Due to this deficiency, the CIE established a special technical committee (TC 1-58) for collecting the results of mesopic visual performance research.

Two very similar measurement systems were created to bridge the scotopic and photopic luminous efficiency functions, creating a unified system of photometry.  This new measurement has been well-received because the reliance on V(λ) alone for characterizing night-time light illumination can result in the use of more electric energy than might otherwise be needed. The energy-savings potential of using a new way to measure mesopic lighting scenarios is significant; superior performance could in certain cases be achieved with as much as 30 to 50% reduction in the energy use comparing to the high pressure sodium lights.

Mesopic weighting function
The mesoscopic weighting function at wavelength  can be written as the weighted sum,
,
The parameter  is a function of the photopic luminance . Various weighting functions are in use, for blue-heavy and red-heavy light sources, as proposed by two organizations, MOVE and Lighting Research Center (LRC).

References

Eye
Vision